Playing My Fiddle for You is Papa John Creach's third solo album and his last with Grunt Records.  All the songs on the album are played with the supporting band Zulu, featuring Kevin Moore who would later be known as Keb' Mo'.  After this album, the supporting band changed their name to Midnight Sun.

Track listing

Side One
"Friendly Possibilities" (Zulu) – 4:08
"Milk Train" (Grace Slick, Papa John Creach, Roger Spotts) – 3:03
"I Miss You So" (Jimmy Henderson, Bertha Scott, Sid Robin) – 3:24
"String Jet Continues" (Creach) – 7:47

Side Two
"Playing My Music" (Zulu) – 3:40
"Git It Up" (Creach, Zulu) – 2:52
"Gretchen" (Creach, Zulu) – 3:46
"One Sweet Song" (Zulu) – 4:11
"Golden Dreams" (Zulu) – 3:08

Personnel
Papa John Creach – violin, vocals

Zulu
Carl Byrd – drums, percussion, vocals
Johnny Parker – clavinet, organ, celeste, vocals
Holden Raphael – congas, percussion, harmonica
Kevin Moore – guitar, cals
Sam Williams – bass

Production
Al Schmitt – producer
Richie Schmitt – engineer
Dennis Smith – assistant engineer
Artie Torgersen – assistant engineer
Marty Paich – horn arrangement
Recorded at RCA Records, Hollywood
H. B. Greene – cover design, photography

Notes

Papa John Creach albums
1974 albums
Albums arranged by Marty Paich
albums produced by Al Schmitt
Grunt Records albums